Plug was a British comic magazine that ran for 75 issues from 24 September 1977 until 24 February 1979, when it merged with The Beezer. It was edited by Ian Gray.

A spin-off from The Bash Street Kids comic strip in The Beano, the comic was based on the character Plug who was a distinctively ugly member of the Bash Street Kids. His dog (Pug) from Pup Parade, and a new character called Chunkee the Monkey (Plug's pet monkey) accompanied him. Vic Neill mainly drew the title character's strip. The comic also had its own fan club, the Plug Sports and Social Club. The comic was inspired in part by Mad.

The Plug comic was never a big hit, possibly because, at 9 pence, it was too expensive compared to other D. C. Thomson comics at the time, which were priced at around 5 pence. According to the 2008 book The History of the Beano, for a while there were rumours of a "curse of Plug", fuelled by the fact that a number of celebrities featured in Mad magazine-style caricatures on the comic's cover died soon after, most notably John Wayne. However, the strip's use of gravure painting is still used in comics today.

List of Plug comic strips

See also

 List of DC Thomson publications

References

External links
 Plug (1977-1979)

DC Thomson Comics titles
Comics magazines published in the United Kingdom
1977 comics debuts
1979 comics endings
Defunct British comics
The Bash Street Kids
British humour comics
Comics spin-offs
Magazines established in 1977
Magazines disestablished in 1979